Curtis James Farrier (born June 25, 1941) is a former American football defensive tackle. He played for the Kansas City Chiefs from 1963 to 1965.

References

1941 births
Living people
American football defensive tackles
Montana State Bobcats football players
Kansas City Chiefs players